Calandia Guidebook is a 1989 role-playing game supplement published by Mayfair Games.

Contents
Calandia Guidebook is a supplement in which background is provided for the world outside of the City-State of the Invincible Overlord.

Publication history
Calandia Guidebook was written by Terry Randall, with a cover by Robert Gould and illustrations by Jerry O'Malley, and was published by Mayfair Games in 1989 as a boxed set containing a 40-page book, a 24-page book, and a digest-sized 32-page book.

Reception
Paul Mason reviewed Calandia Guidebook for Games International magazine, and gave it 2 stars out of 5, and stated that "The Calandia series provides a traditional D&D style background with pleasant presentation. Unfortunately there's absolutely nothing special about it."

References

Fantasy role-playing game supplements
Role-playing game supplements introduced in 1989